The  was held on 7 February 1982 in Yokohama Citizens Hall, Yokohama, Kanagawa, Japan.

Awards
 Best Film: Something Like It
 Best New Actor: Bang-ho Cho – Gaki Teikoku, Gaki Teikoku Akutare Sensō
 Best Actor: Toshiyuki Nagashima – Enrai
 Best Actress: Maiko Kazama – Woman Who Exposes Herself
 Best New Actress:
Yuki Ninagawa – Kurutta kajitsu
Yoshiko Oshimi – Yarareta Onna
 Best Supporting Actor: Renji Ishibashi – Kemono-tachi no Atsui Nemuri
 Best Supporting Actress: Yūko Tanaka – Eijanaika, Edo Porn
 Best Director: Enrai- Kichitaro Negishi, Kurutta kajitsu
 Best New Director: Yoshimitsu Morita – Something Like It
 Best Screenplay: Haruhiko Arai – Enrai
 Best Cinematography: Shohei Ando – Enrai, Muddy River
 Best Independent Film: Afternoon Breezes
 Special Prize: Ken Takakura (Career)

Best 10
 Something Like It
 Crazy Fruit
 Enrai
 Gaki Teikoku
 Kagero-za
 Muddy River
 Kofuku
 Station
 Honoo no Gotoku
 Kazetachi no Gogo
runner-up: Woman Who Exposes Herself

References

Yokohama Film Festival
Yokohama Film Festival
Yokohama Film Festival
Yokohama Film Festival